Henry Pope may refer to:

 Henry Martin Pope (1843-1908), English painter
 Henry Nelson Pope (1859–1956), Texas farmer
 Henry Pope (Prison Break), a character from the TV series Prison Break